Rahzel's Greatest Knock Outs! is the second album by American beatboxer and hip hop artist Rahzel. It was released on June 1, 2004, via Sure Shot Recordings.

Track listing

Personnel

Rahzel Manely Brown – main artist
William Tramontozzi – executive producer, scratches (tracks: 2, 8, 13, 14), DJ mix
A. Turner – executive producer
Chris Landry – executive producer
Russell Jones – executive producer
Ahmir Khalib Thompson – featured artist (track 15)
Erik Francis Schrody – featured artist (track 9)
Karl Jenkins – featured artist (track 15)
Keith Murray – featured artist (track 26)
Kenny Muhammad The Human Orchestra – featured artist (track 6)
Lawrence Parker – featured artist (track 2)
Lynden David Hall – featured artist (track 12)
Pedro Antonio Rojas, Jr. – featured artist (track 10)
Reco Price – featured artist (track 14)
Richard Martin Lloyd Walters – featured artist (track 19)
Robert Aguilar – scratches (track 21)
Robert Fitzgerald Diggs – featured artist (tracks: 5, 22)
Robert Waller – featured artist (track 17)
Sean "Lord Tariq" Hamilton – featured artist (track 26)
Tariq "Black Thought" Trotter – featured artist (tracks: 7, 15)
Thomas DeCarlo Callaway – featured artist (track 23)
Wendell Timothy Fite – featured artist (track 7)
Benjamin Altman – artwork & design
Kaysh Shinn – photography

Rahzel's Greatest Knock Outs: Volume 2
Another volume of Rahzel's Greatest Knock Outs was planned to be released in the summer of 2008. It was supposed to be his first solo album released after splitting with The Roots, but the project was never released. It was to feature two singles called “Ring the Alarm” and “Come Fly With Me (featuring Mike Patton)”.

References

External links

Rahzel albums
2003 greatest hits albums